The Bangladesh Congress is a political party in Bangladesh, founded in 2013.

History
The Bangladesh Congress was founded in March 2013. Adv. Kazi Rezaul Hossain is the president of the party and. Md. Earul Islam its secretary. Engineer Mr. A R Sikdar remains as founding member and advisor of the Bangladesh Congress ever since.

Electoral results
The Bangladesh Congress has never gained a seat in the Bangladesh Parliament. In the 2019 Bogra-6 by-election it received 0.3% of the vote. In 2020, it contested three by-elections, gaining 0.1% of the vote in each of Dhaka-10, Dhaka-5, and Dhaka-18. It did better in the 2021 Sylhet-3 by-election, in which it received 0.5% of the vote.

See also
 Politics of Bangladesh
 List of political parties in Bangladesh

External links 
  Official website of the party.

References

Islamic political parties in Bangladesh
Political parties in Bangladesh
Political parties with year of establishment missing
Political parties established in 2013